The men's 25 metre rapid fire pistol competition at the 2006 Asian Games in Doha, Qatar was held on 6 December at the Lusail Shooting Range.

Schedule
All times are Arabia Standard Time (UTC+03:00)

Records

Results
Legend
DNS — Did not start

Qualification

Final

 Vijay Kumar was awarded bronze because of no three-medal sweep per country rule.

References

ISSF Results Overview
Qualification Results

External links
Official website

Men Pistol 25 R